Yair Hurvitz (1941–1988), also known as Yair Horowitz, was an Israeli poet who began publishing poetry in the 1960s,  he was a member of the "Tel Aviv Poets" group.  His poems mark a return to the tradition of Haim Nachman Bialik. According to literary critic, Ariel Hirschfeld, a poem by Hurvitz comes close "to an invocation, to the creation of a visionary world by means of the word."

He died in 1988 at the age of 47 from the heart disease that had plagued him since childhood.

References

Israeli poets
1941 births
1988 deaths
20th-century poets
Burials at Kiryat Shaul Cemetery